A list of Bangladeshi films released in 1956. Only one film were released that year.

Released Films

See also

 1956 in Bangladesh
 Cinema of Bangladesh

References

External links 
 Bangladeshi films on Internet Movie Database

Film
Bangladesh
Lists of Pakistani Bengali films by year